Jerry Adler (born February 4, 1929) is an American theatre director, producer, and film and television actor. He is perhaps best known for his films Manhattan Murder Mystery, The Public Eye, In Her Shoes, and Prime, and for his television work as Herman "Hesh" Rabkin on The Sopranos, Howard Lyman on The Good Wife and The Good Fight, building maintenance man Mr. Wicker on Mad About You, Bob Saget's father Sam Stewart on Raising Dad, Fire Chief Sidney Feinberg on Rescue Me, Moshe Pfefferman on Transparent, Saul Horowitz on Broad City, and Hillston on Living with Yourself with Paul Rudd.

Early life
Adler was born and raised in Brooklyn, New York, the son of Pauline and Philip Adler, who was a general manager of the Group Theatre. His great-uncle was Yiddish theater actor Jacob Pavlovich Adler, whose children Stella and Luther Adler were his cousins. He was raised in a Yiddish-speaking, observant Jewish household.

Career 
Adler began his theatre career as a stage manager in 1950, working on such productions as Of Thee I Sing and My Fair Lady before becoming a production supervisor for The Apple Tree, Black Comedy/White Lies, Dear World, Coco, 6 Rms Riv Vu, Annie, and I Remember Mama, among others. He made his directing debut with the 1974 Sammy Cahn revue Words and Music and also directed the 1976 revival of My Fair Lady, which garnered him a Drama Desk Award nomination, and the ill-fated 1981 musical The Little Prince and the Aviator. He also directed the 1976 play Checking Out.

Other credits includes Drat! The Cat!; a 1976 revival of Hellzapoppin starring Jerry Lewis ("Awful, terrible man"); and Richard Rodgers' final musical, I Remember Mama.

As an actor, Adler is perhaps best known for his roles as Herman "Hesh" Rabkin on The Sopranos, Mr. Wicker on Mad About You, Bob Saget's father Sam Stewart on Raising Dad, Lt. Al Teischler on Hudson Street, and Howard Lyman on both The Good Wife and The Good Fight. He made three appearances on Northern Exposure as Alan Schulman, Joel Fleischman's old neighborhood rabbi seen in visions.

In addition, Adler appeared in an episode of The West Wing as Toby Ziegler's father, Jules Ziegler. The elder Ziegler worked as a 1950s member of Murder, Inc. Adler also appeared as the new chief Sidney Feinberg in the fourth season of FX's firefighter drama Rescue Me. He guest starred as Eddie's father Al in season three and season four of 'Til Death.

His screen credits include Manhattan Murder Mystery, The Public Eye, In Her Shoes and Prime. In 2014, he starred as Joseph Mendelsohn in A Most Violent Year opposite Jessica Chastain & Oscar Issac.

From 2017 to 2019, Adler played Moshe Pfefferman, the father of Jeffrey Tambor's character, on the Amazon series Transparent. From 2017 to 2018, he reprised his role as Howard Lyman on CBS's The Good Fight starring Christine Baranski.

In 2019, he portrayed Saul Horowitz on Broad City and Hillston on Living with Yourself with Paul Rudd.

He also acted in Larry David's Broadway play Fish in the Dark.

Filmography

Film

Television

References

External links

1929 births
Living people
American male film actors
American male stage actors
American male television actors
American theatre managers and producers
Jewish American male actors
Male actors from New York City
20th-century American male actors
21st-century American male actors
People from Brooklyn
American people of Ukrainian-Jewish descent
21st-century American Jews